The 1973 Pacific Coast Open, also known by its sponsored name Fireman's Fund International, was a men's tennis tournament that was part of the Grade B category of the 1973 Grand Prix circuit. The event was played on outdoor hard courts at the Round Hill Country Club in Alamo in the San Francisco Bay Area, United States. It was the 85th edition  of the tournament and was held from September 23 through September 30, 1973. Fourth-seeded Roy Emerson won the singles title and the accompanying $9,000 first-prize money and 40 Grand Prix points.

Finals

Singles

 Roy Emerson defeated  Björn Borg 5–7, 6–1, 6–4

Doubles

 Roy Emerson /  Stan Smith defeated  Ove Nils Bengtson /  Jim McManus 6–2, 6–1

References

External links
 ITF tournament edition details

Pacific Coast International Open
1973 World Championship Tennis circuit
Pacific Coast International Open
Pacific Coast International Open
Pacific Coast International Open
Pacific Coast International Open